Antonis Nikopolidis (born 14 January 1971) is a Greek professional football manager and former player.

He is regarded among the best Greek goalkeepers of all time having been awarded the most caps in the Greece national team and playing an integral part in the UEFA Euro 2004 triumph.

Club career

Anagennisi Arta
Nikopolidis made his first steps at his local team of Anagennisi Arta, from which he was transferred to Panathinaikos in the summer of 1989.

Panathinaikos
He made his debut during the 1990–91 season in a match against his future club, Olympiacos. In his first years as a Panathinaikos player he was a back-up for Józef Wandzik. In 1995, he played five games as Panathinaikos won the championship and three as they retained it the following year. However, it wasn't until the 1997–98 season that he established himself as a regular goalkeeper at the age of 26. In the 2002 Champions league, he helped the club reach the quarter-finals but, in the 2003–04 season, he lost his place to Konstantinos Chalkias when his contract negotiations broke down.

Panathinaikos offered him €400K per year which, although a pay-rise, he thought was not in line with his contributions to the team over the past 15 years nor with his current market value. As he did not immediately accept the offer the management became suspicious and decided to relegate him to the bench for the rest of the 2003–04 season. The Greek sports media and Panathinaikos fans at first took his side in the conflict and criticised president Vardinogiannis.

Just before UEFA Euro 2004, rumours were circulating that Nikopolidis had been approached by arch-rivals Olympiacos. It was discovered later that he had signed an agreement just before the tournament begun earning him €600K per year for three years. After that, the fans' disappointment in him was displayed during the celebrations following the team's 2003–04 season double when Nikopolidis, while raising the trophy, was booed by the majority of the crowd.

Olympiacos

Soon after being instrumental in UEFA Euro 2004 helping Greece to lift the trophy, Nikopolidis joined Olympiacos, making an immediate impact for his once rival team. Keeping a clean sheet in the first derby against his former club in the process, he went on to win two Doubles in a row, making him the only Greek player to win three consecutive doubles with two different clubs.

At his new team, Nikopolidis also earned a reputation for making game-winning saves in the most important games. Displaying his penalty-saving abilities, Nikopolidis saved three penalty kicks against Roma, Real Madrid, and Rosenborg BK, making him undefeated from the penalty spot in UEFA Champions League football in the Olympiacos shirt. In the 2007–08 season, he also equaled the Greek league record for the most penalty kicks saved in one season, which included saves against PAOK and former club Panathinaikos. Nikopolidis announced his plans to retire at the end of the 2009–10 season.

However, he took back his decision to stop his career after Sokratis Kokkalis's insistence. The veteran goalkeeper stated that he would delay his retirement for one more year, to retire as champion. He signed an extension on 16 June that would keep him at Olympiacos for the 2010–11 season.

He also took part in the international match "8th Match Against Poverty", on 14 December 2010, in Karaiskakis Stadium in Greece, as the UNDP team's goalkeeper.

In January 2011, IFFHS released a list with the best goalkeepers of the first decade, and Nikopolidis was in. He was also listed as one of the best goalkeepers of the years 1987 to 2011.

On 20 March 2011, Olympiacos won the championship in a 6–0 win against rivals AEK Athens F.C., in Karaiskakis Stadium.

He made his final appearance on 17 April 2011 in a home 6–0 victory against Larissa F.C. in Karaiskakis Stadium. As a final curtain call, he was replaced by Balázs Megyeri in the last minutes, so he could wave goodbye to the Olympiacos fans.

As the Olympiacos captain, he was the player to accept the championship trophy, after the match.

International career
Nikopolidis made his debut for the Greece national football team on 18 August 1999 against El Salvador.

He played in the qualifying rounds of the 2002 FIFA World Cup and Euro 2004 where he excelled as Greece qualified for the finals. Nikopolidis was one of the cornerstones of the Greek win in Portugal, where he kept three clean sheets in the knockout stages. He was also voted goalkeeper of the Euro 2004 All Star team.

On 15 June 2008, Nikopolidis announced his retirement from international football after Euro 2008, claiming that he had made this decision before the tournament started, and also stating that it is about time for a major change in the Greek national squad.

Managerial career
After retirement, Nikopolidis became the assistant manager of Olympiacos in 2012.

He was promoted to manager in January 2013 on an interim basis following the dismissal of Leonardo Jardim. After the arrival of Míchel, he remained in the team as his assistant.

After the end of 2012–13 season, Nikopolidis left Olympiacos in order to start his career as a head coach.

On 1 October 2015, he was named as manager of the Greece national under-21 football team.

Style of play
Despite not being particularly tall or agile, his excellent positional sense made him an effective shot-stopper and his ability to read and understand the game helped him rush quickly off his line in order to face one on one situations or act as a sweeper-keeper.

Career statistics

Club

International

Managerial statistics

Honours

Player
Panathinaikos
Super League Greece: 1989–90, 1990–91, 1994–95, 1995–96, 2003–04
Greek Cup: 1990–91, 1992–93, 1993–94, 1994–95, 2003–04
Greek Super Cup: 1993, 1994
 
Olympiacos
Super League Greece: 2004–05, 2005–06, 2006–07, 2007–08, 2008–09, 2010–11
Greek Cup: 2004–05, 2005–06, 2007–08, 2008–09
Greek Super Cup: 2007

Greece
UEFA European Football Championship: 2004

Individual
Greek Best Goalkeeper (8): 1999–2000, 2001–02, 2002–03, 2003–04, 2004–05, 2005–06, 2007–08, 2008–09 (Record)
UEFA European Football Championship Team of the Tournament Member: 2004

Managerial
As assistant coach
Greek Championship: 2013
Greek Cup: 2013

References

External links

1971 births
Living people
Footballers from Arta, Greece
Association football goalkeepers
Anagennisi Arta F.C. players
Greek footballers
Olympiacos F.C. players
Panathinaikos F.C. players
UEFA Euro 2004 players
2005 FIFA Confederations Cup players
UEFA Euro 2008 players
UEFA European Championship-winning players
Greece international footballers
Super League Greece players